Luyuan District is one of seven districts of the prefecture-level city of Changchun, the capital of Jilin Province, Northeast China, forming part of the city's urban core. It borders Kuancheng District to the north and east, Chaoyang District to the south, and Nong'an County to the north and west, as well as the prefecture-level city of Siping to the west.

Administrative divisions
There are seven subdistricts, one town, and two townships.

Subdistricts:
Chuncheng Subdistrict, Puyang Subdistrict, Zhengyang Subdistrict, Dongfeng Subdistrict, Jincheng Subdistrict, Tiexi Subdistrict, Qingnian Road Subdistrict

The only town is Hexin

Townships:
Chengxi Township, Xixin Township

Notes

References

External links
Official website of Luyuan District Government
www.xzqh.org 

County-level divisions of Jilin
Changchun